Pepe Jeans London is a denim and casual wear jeans brand established in the Portobello Road area of London in 1973, and now based in Sant Feliu de Llobregat, Spain.

Carlos Ortega was the CEO, and owns more than 20% of the company.

History
Pepe Jeans was founded in 1973 by three brothers who ran a weekend stall at Portobello Road Market in London, before expanding to a store in Carnaby Street and then into Europe in the 1980s.

In 1988, Pepe Jeans was owned by Arun, Nitin and Milan Shah.

In February 2015, Pepe Jeans and Hackett London (part of the Pepe Jeans Group) were bought by the Lebanese M1 Group, and the LVMH subsidiary, L Capital Asia. These companies were previously owned by Torreal Funds (31 per cent), Artá Capital (16.4 per cent), L Capital Europe (11.5 per cent), and its managers.

In 2015, Pepe Jeans announced the Group was adding a new brand, Norton Clothing, a tribute to the British motorcycle brand founded in 1898.

In September 2019, Marcella Wartenbergh became CEO of Pepe Jeans Group.

References

External links
Official website

Clothing brands
Jeans by brand
Clothing brands of Spain
British companies established in 1973
Spanish companies established in 1973
Clothing companies established in 1973
Retail companies established in 1973
Companies based in Catalonia
Manufacturing companies of Spain